Equinox is a British science and documentary programme. The series ran from 31 July 1986 to 21 December 2006, originally airing on a weekly basis on Channel 4.

The number of films per series fell over the years, from eighteen one-hour films a year originally to twelve by the late 1990s. The last regular series was shown on 21 December 2006, with twelve films. One-off films have occasionally been aired under the title "Equinox Special" (e.g. the 90-minute Secrets of the Super Psychics first transmitted in 1997).

Notable episodes
F1 TURBO - Once Around The Block (1986) – follows the development of the Ford Cosworth GBA TEC V6 Twin Turbo Formula 1 engine
Dismantling The Bomb (1994) – just how do you dismantle the world's nuclear weapons stockpile?
It Runs On Water (1995) – the alternative energy and over-unity energy revolution – foreword by Arthur C Clarke
A Very British Bomb (1997) – the development of the UK's home grown H-bomb
The Engines That Came In From The Cold (2001) – decades-old Soviet rocket engines that are way ahead of anything being made in the West and NASA wants them.

Episodes

See also
Horizon comparable BBC2 strand, on air since 1964.
Q.E.D. more populist BBC1 science documentary series, which ran from 1982 to 1999.
Nova documentary series on PBS in the United States, which often bought in and re-voiced Equinox and Horizon films.

External links

Equinox, British Film Institute. List of films, with dates.
Equinox, Showdates list of all Equinox films

 
Channel 4 original programming
Documentary television series about science
English-language television shows
Popular science
Science and technology in the United Kingdom
1986 British television series debuts
2006 British television series endings
1980s British documentary television series
1990s British documentary television series
2000s British documentary television series